Paint as a Fragrance is the first studio album by American punk rock band Rocket from the Crypt. It was released in 1991 by Cargo Records and Headhunter Records. It is the band's only recording featuring their original lineup, which included drummer Sean Flynn and backing vocalist Elaina Torres.

Production
The album was recorded for $1,000.

Critical reception
Westword called the album "an impressive, although scattered, sampler of the band's distinctive punk/pop sound." Trouser Press wrote that "while the album does boast a surfeit of energy, the band often feints when it should jab, backing off intensely memorable riffs while dragging uneventful throbs to the point of tedium." Stylus Magazine called it a "muscular, Pixies-ish, less than stellar 1991 debut that rarely hinted at the brilliance to come."

Track listing
"French Guy"
"Maybelline"
"Shy Boy"
"Basturds"
"Velvet Touch"
"Evil Party"
"Stinker"
"Jiggy Jig"
"Weak Superhero"
"Thumbmaster"

Performers
Speedo (John Reis) - guitar, lead vocals
Andy Stamets - guitar, backing vocals
Pete Reichert - bass, backing vocals
Sean - drums
Elaina - backing vocals
Rick Froberg, Ian Roarty, Mike Kennedy, and Chuck - additional backing vocals

Album information
Record label:Cargo Records/Headhunter Records
Recorded at Westbeach Recorders in Los Angeles
Produced by John Reis
Preproduction by Gar Wood
Engineered by Donnell Cameron
Mastered at K-Disc
Photography by  Jonny Donhowe
Disc art by Mark Gariss
CD layout by O, Jonny Donhowe, and Dean Kegler
Cover model: Tim Johnson
Insert drawing by Dean Reis

References

1991 debut albums
Rocket from the Crypt albums